The Cadets of Gascony (Italian: I cadetti di Guascogna) is a 1950 Italian comedy film directed by Mario Mattoli and starring Walter Chiari, Carlo Campanini and Mario Riva. It was shot at the Farnesina Studios in Rome, with sets designed by the art director Leonidas Marcolis. Location shooting took place at Bracciano in Lazio where the film is set. It earned 450 million lira at the Italian box office.

Synopsis
Walter and Ugo are both in love with the same girl Vittoria, but her disapproving aunt sends her away to Bracciano. Unknown to her both men are called up for military service and are posted to the town. They arrange a rendezvous with her at a cinema but, confined to barracks and unable to attend, they send their fellow soldier Nino along. To their irritation, Vittoria falls in love with Nino. To try and sabotage this they promote the rumour that Nino is engaged in an affair with an attractive soubrette. In fact she is his sister, in town with her touring musical troupe. Eventually all is resolved happily, with the soldiers participating in a show billed as "The Cadets of Gascony".

Cast
 Walter Chiari as Walter Mantoni
 Carlo Campanini as Sergente Composti
 Mario Riva as Mario Fantoni
 Riccardo Billi as Riccardo Bolletta
 Ugo Tognazzi as Ugo Bossi
 Virgilio Riento as Angelo Danati
 Fulvia Mammi as Vittoria
 Alda Mandini as Bice
 Gianni Musi as Nino Quaranta 
 Ada Dondini as Zia Adelina
 Eveline Saffi as Dea Nuccis
 Wanda Parisi as Self
 Ebe Parisi as Self
 Diana Dei as Caterina
 Carlo Croccolo as Soldato Pinozzo
 Nerio Bernardi as Il colonnello
 Enzo Garinei as Il farmacista
 Aldo Giuffrè as Un caporale

References

Bibliography

External links 
 

1950 films
Italian black-and-white films
1950s Italian-language films
1950 comedy films
Films directed by Mario Mattoli
Italian comedy films
Minerva Film films
Films set in Lazio
1950s Italian films